Aeclanum (also spelled Aeculanum) was an ancient town of Samnium, Southern Italy, about 25 km east-southeast of Beneventum, on the Via Appia. It lies in Passo di Mirabella, near the modern Mirabella Eclano.

It is now an archaeological park.

Location 

Aeclanum was on a promontory naturally defended, to some extent, by a steep slope on the south side down to the river Calore, while the north side lay open towards the crest of the ridge that where the Via Appia ran. This led through Lacus Ampsanctus to Aquilonia and Venusia. The road from Aeclanum to Abellinum (modern Atripalda, near Avellino) may also follow an ancient line. 

Today there are ruins of the city walls, of an aqueduct, baths and an amphitheatre; nearly 400 inscriptions have also been discovered. Excavation has revealed a long history of pre-Roman settlement.

History 
Aeclanum was a town of the Hirpini, although it was never mentioned during the Samnite wars. Sulla captured it in 89 BC by setting on fire the wooden breastwork by which it was defended, and sacked it. It quickly recovered, new fortifications were erected, and it became a municipium. Hadrian, who repaired the Via Appia from Beneventum to this point, made it a colonia (colony).
 
With the Lombard invasion of Italy, in the 6th century AD, it was annexed to the Duchy of Benevento, but was captured and destroyed by Eastern Roman forces under Constans II in 663 and never recovered, being reduced to a small hamlet known as Quintodecimo, a name that referred to its distance of 15 Roman miles from Benevento.

Bishopric 
Aeclanum became a Christian episcopal see, whose best known bishop was Julian of Eclanum, who was consecrated by Pope Innocent I in about 417. He refused to sign the condemnation of Pelagianism issued by Pope Innocent's successor, Pope Zosimus, and carried on a war of writings against Augustine of Hippo. It has been thought that the diocese was united to that of Frequentium as early as the 5th century, but there is mention of Quintodecimo as a suffragan see of Benevento in 969 and 1058. From 1059 it was definitively united with Frequentium. No longer a residential bishopric, Aeclanum is today listed by the Catholic Church as a titular see.

Gallery

References

External links

 Aeclanum (Cultural Property of Campania website)
 Aeclanum (Mirabella Eclano municipal website)

Roman sites of Campania
Samnite cities
Former populated places in Italy
Province of Avellino
Human remains (archaeological)
Archaeological sites in Campania
Roman towns and cities in Italy
Archaeological parks
Buildings and structures in Campania
Tourist attractions in Campania
Tourism in Italy
Osci
Italic archaeological sites
Ruins in Italy
Destroyed cities
Coloniae (Roman)